The Saskatoon Electrical System Substation is a municipal designated historic building located in the Nutana neighborhood of Saskatoon, Saskatchewan, Canada.  The property contains a two-story building in a Modern Classical style, made of No. 2 Redcliff, Light Claybank and Tee Pee Mocha brick construction.  The building was constructed in 1929 by Saskatoon Light & Power along with two other such stations to meet the growing electrical demand of the city; declared a heritage site on December 4, 2000; and renovated into offices in the 1990s the building now houses the offices of the architectural firm of Kindrachuk Agrey Architects.

References

Buildings and structures in Saskatoon
Infrastructure completed in 1929